Vivsia  is a village in Ternopil Raion, Ternopil Oblast  (province) in western Ukraine. Vivsia belongs to Kozova settlement hromada, one of the hromadas of Ukraine. Its population was 800 inhabitants in 2018.

Until 18 July 2020, Vivsia belonged to Kozova Raion. The raion was abolished in July 2020 as part of the administrative reform of Ukraine, which reduced the number of raions of Ternopil Oblast to three. The area of Kozova Raion was merged into Ternopil Raion.

Etymology
Name Vivsia derived from the Ukrainian words овес (oves), вовес (voves), говес (hoves), means avena in English.

Gallery

References

External links
 Page on Official Website of Verkhovna Rada

Villages in Ternopil Raion